Howard Watson Ambruster (1879 – January 10, 1961) was an American football coach, chemical engineer, actor, and lecturer. He was the head football coach at Rutgers University for one season, in 1895, compiling a record of 3–4.  Armbruster also played tennis and competed in the 1899 Pennsylvania Lawn Tennis Championships.

Ambruster attended Germantown Academy.  He entered the University of Pennsylvania with class of 1899, but left the school before graduating to coach football at Rutgers. A longtime resident of Westfield, New Jersey, he moved to Fanwood, New Jersey in 1949, and died at his home there at the age of 82, on January 10, 1961. He was interred at Ivy Hill Cemetery in Philadelphia.

Head coaching record

References

1879 births
1961 deaths
20th-century American engineers
American chemical engineers
American male tennis players
Burials at Ivy Hill Cemetery (Philadelphia)
Rutgers Scarlet Knights football coaches
Germantown Academy alumni
University of Pennsylvania alumni
People from Fanwood, New Jersey
People from Westfield, New Jersey